Malaya Tsilna is the name of several rural localities in Russia:
Malaya Tsilna, Republic of Tatarstan, a selo in Drozhzhanovsky District of the Republic of Tatarstan
Malaya Tsilna, Ulyanovsk Oblast, a village in Tsilninsky District of Ulyanovsk Oblast